An inkwell is a small jar or container that is used for holding ink

Inkwell can also refer to:
 Inkwell (Lake Landing, North Carolina), on the US National Register of Historic Places
 Inkwell (Macintosh),  handwriting recognition technology built into Mac OS X
 Inkwell (band), an alternative rock band
 Inkwell (journal), a literary journal at Manhattanville College
 Ink Well, the name of a section of Santa Monica State Beach
 The Inkwell, a 1994 film
 The Inkwell, a beach on Martha's Vineyard.
 The Inkwell (album) by Sean Garrett
 Inkwell Studios, the original name for Fleischer Studios
 Inkwell Awards, also known as the Inkwells, for American comic book inkers
 Inkwell, a character in the 2013 comic issue Princess Celestia for List of My Little Pony comics issued by IDW Publishing

See also
Out of the Inkwell, a 1918-1929 animated series by Max Fleischer
The Inkpot, a sinkhole in New Mexico, USA
Inkpot Award, at San Diego Comic-Con